Eye Know is a board game that includes images, trivia and betting. It was created by Paul Berton and George Sinclair and published in 2008 by Wiggles 3D.

Paul Berton is the son of Canadian historian Pierre Berton. He was at the time the editor-in-chief of The London Free Press, and is now editor-in-chief of The Hamilton Spectator. George Sinclair is a technical writer.

Gameplay
One distinctive feature of this game is that it combines trivia with identifying images and betting. Another is that players select the topics of their trivia questions.

Players try to identify images on cards on the board. Once a player has identified an image, they are asked a trivia question related to the image. The player selects the level of difficulty of their question and decides how many chips to bet on whether they know the answer. Different question levels pay out different amounts: true/false questions pay 1:1, multiple-choice questions pay 2:1 and open-ended questions pay 3:1.

Awards
American Mensa chose Eye Know as a winner of the Mensa Select award in 2008.

References

External links
 Official site
 Game Instructions
 

Board games introduced in 2008
Quiz games
Party board games
Canadian board games
Mensa Select winners